John MacNaughton or variant spellings, may refer to:

John A. MacNaughton (1945–2013), a Canadian investment banker
John H. MacNaughton (born 1929), an American bishop 
John McNaughton (born 1950), an American film and TV director
John McNaughton (government official) (1921–1967), American official
Jock McNaughton (1912–1986), a Scottish professional footballer 
John Macnaghten (1722–1761), known as Half-Hanged MacNaghten, an Anglo-Irish convicted murderer
Jon McNaughton, an American painter of conservative political themes